The omubanda is a type of end-blown flute native to Uganda.

It is generally made of bamboo or reed, with a notch cut into the end and three or four finger-holes.

Sources
Digitalisatie van het Etnomusicologisch Klankarchief van het Koninklijk Museum voor Midden-Afrika / Digitization of the Ethnomusicological Sound Archive of the Royal Museum for Central Africa
Ugandan musical instruments
End-blown flutes